Lewis Emmett Carpenter (August 16, 1913 – April 25, 1979) was a professional baseball player. He was a right-handed pitcher who made four appearances during the 1943 season for the Washington Senators, recording no decisions and allowing no earned runs in 3⅓ innings pitched.

An alumnus of the Georgia Institute of Technology, Carpenter was born in Woodstock, Georgia and died in Marietta, Georgia at the age of 65. He is buried in Dawson Cemetery in Cobb County, Georgia.

External links

1913 births
1979 deaths
Sportspeople from the Atlanta metropolitan area
Washington Senators (1901–1960) players
Major League Baseball pitchers
Baseball players from Marietta, Georgia
Georgia Tech Yellow Jackets baseball players
Louisville Colonels (minor league) players
Montgomery Rebels players
Macon Peaches players
Gadsden Pilots players
Elmira Pioneers players
Atlanta Crackers players
Memphis Chickasaws players
Chattanooga Lookouts players
Minneapolis Millers (baseball) players
People from Woodstock, Georgia